C5a anaphylatoxin chemotactic receptor 2 is a protein that in humans is encoded by the C5AR2 gene. It's a complement component G protein-coupled receptor, of class A (rhodopsin-like).

Function 

The anaphylatoxins C3a, C4a, and C5a are cationic fragments generated during the complement cascade that participate in host defense. In the case of inappropriate complement activation, anaphylatoxins may be involved in autoimmunity and sepsis. C5a2 is coexpressed with the C5a receptor, (C5a1, C5aR, C5R1, CD88), on polymorphonuclear neutrophils and may modulate C5a1 activity.

References

Further reading

External links
 

G protein-coupled receptors